Funston may refer to:

People

Edmund Bailey Funston (fl. 1868–1916), American architect
Edward H. Funston (1836–1911), U.S. Representative from Kansas
Farrell Funston (born 1936), American-born Canadian football player
Frederick Funston (1865–1917), U.S. Army general in the Spanish–American and Philippine–American Wars
G. Keith Funston (1910–1992), American businessman and university president
Grace Funston (1900–1984), Australian musician
Ken Funston (1925–2005, South African cricketer

Places
Camp Funston, Kansas
Funston, Georgia, United States
Fort Funston, California